Rodney Douglas Graham (born August 19, 1946) is a Canadian former professional ice hockey player who played 14 games in the National Hockey League with the Boston Bruins during the 1974–75 season. The rest of his career, which lasted from 1967 to 1978, was spent in the minor leagues.

Career statistics

Regular season and playoffs

External links
 

1946 births
Living people
Boston Bruins players
Canadian ice hockey coaches
Canadian ice hockey left wingers
Ice hockey people from Ontario
Kingston Canadians coaches
Oklahoma City Blazers (1965–1977) players
Ontario Hockey Association Senior A League (1890–1979) players
Rochester Americans players
Springfield Indians players
Sportspeople from London, Ontario
Undrafted National Hockey League players